Gol Chakkar is a 2012 Pakistani comedy film directed by Shahbaz Shigri, produced and written by Aisha Linnea Akhtar. Film features Ali Rehman Khan, Hasan Bruun Akhtar, Usman Mukhtar, Salmaan Ahmed Shaukat, Uzair Jaswal, Adil Gul, Saboor Pasha, Asad Ali Shigri and special appearance by Shahana Khan Khalil. This film is a sequel to Sole Search on the life of a character Candy Bhai from the earlier version. Candy Bhai, along with some new characters, gets into trouble when the boys decide to head over to Rawalpindi.

Synopsis 
A gang of fun-loving hooligans or Jinnah Boys find themselves in trouble when they cross paths with a small-time gangster from the other side of the tracks.

Cast 
 Ali Rehman Khan
 Hasan Bruun Akhtar
 Usman Mukhtar as Shera
 Uzair Jaswal
 Salmaan Ahmed Shaukat
 Asad Ali Shigri
 Adil Gul
 Saboor Pasha
 Shahana Khan Khalil
 Waqas

Soundtrack 
The soundtrack includes Pindi Express Adil Omar and also features additional vocals by Usman Mukhtar in character as Shera.

Release 
Theatrical trailer was released in September 2012 and the movie was screened in October 2012.

References

External links 
 
 

2012 films
2012 comedy films
Pakistani independent films
Pakistani comedy films
2012 independent films